Herriard railway station was a railway station in the village of Herriard, Hampshire, UK. The station was a stop on the Basingstoke and Alton Light Railway until its closure in 1932. On Sunday, 19 August 1928, a crash scene from the film The Wrecker was filmed at Herriard. A set of SECR coaches and a Class F1 locomotive no. A148 were released on an incline to collide into a Foden steam lorry.
As in 2020 the platforms survive as part of a garden wall either side of a roadway.

References

External links
 Basingstoke's railway history

Disused railway stations in Hampshire
Former London and South Western Railway stations
Railway stations in Great Britain opened in 1901
Railway stations in Great Britain closed in 1917
Railway stations in Great Britain opened in 1924
Railway stations in Great Britain closed in 1936